XHRTPZ-FM is a community radio station in Tepoztlán, Morelos, Mexico, broadcasting on 92.3 FM. It is owned by Teponaztle Cultura y Comunicación, A.C. and brands as Radio Tepoztlán.

History
XHRTPZ received its permit in February 2010. In February 2022, as the result of a failure to timely renew its concession, it received a new one and a new call sign, XHSCIX-FM. The call sign on the new concession was changed back to XHRTPZ-FM in September 20222.

Notes

References

External links
Radio Tepoztlán Facebook

Radio stations in Morelos
Community radio stations in Mexico
Radio stations established in 2010
2010 establishments in Mexico